William Bratton Hays (January 12, 1844 – September 16, 1912) served as Mayor of Pittsburgh from March 15, 1903 to 1906.

Early life
Hays was born into a meat packing family in 1844. He made his fortune in the coal industry in nearby Indiana County, Pennsylvania; he was also involved in the lumber business in North Carolina.

Pittsburgh politics
Hays first served in government as city assessor.

He was appointed the mayor of Pittsburgh by the Pennsylvania Governor after Mayor Diehl's corruption scandal.  During his service the governor re-installed elections in the city and he was subsequently voted in as mayor.

Hays presided over some of Pittsburgh's greatest feats and also one of its greatest disasters. The Pittsburgh Pirates went to the first ever World Series in 1903, and the film industry's first Nickelodeon movie theater was opened on Smithfield Street in 1905. Hays though also had to contend with the devastating city hall fire making the government home a total loss and destroying many records and documents in the process.

Later life
Hays died in 1912 and was buried in Allegheny Cemetery. The Hays neighborhood of Pittsburgh was named in his honor.

References

1844 births
1912 deaths
Mayors of Pittsburgh
People from Indiana County, Pennsylvania
Burials at Allegheny Cemetery
19th-century American politicians